Simanthedon is a genus of long-horned bees in the family Apidae. There is one described species in Simanthedon, S. linsleyi.

References

Further reading

 

Apinae
Articles created by Qbugbot